Braglia is an Italian surname. Notable people with the surname include:

Alberto Braglia (1883–1954), Italian gymnast
Giorgio Braglia (born 1947), Italian footballer
Piero Braglia (born 1955), Italian footballer and manager

See also
Stadio Alberto Braglia, football stadium in Modena, Italy

Italian-language surnames